Liam Kavanagh (9 February 1935 – 13 December 2021) was an Irish Labour Party politician.

Biography
He was first elected to Dáil Éireann at the 1969 general election as a Labour Party Teachta Dála (TD) for the Wicklow constituency. He remained in the Dáil until he lost his seat at the 1997 general election. He was also appointed to the European Parliament on two occasions in 1973 and 1977 and was elected to the parliament in 1979 for the Leinster constituency. He gave up this seat on being appointed Minister for Labour and Minister for the Public Service in 1981.

Kavanagh also served as a member of the British–Irish Parliamentary Assembly from 1990 to 1997 and of the Semi-State Bodies Commission from 1987 to 1997, being chairman from 1995 to 1997.

He was appointed to the Standards in Public Office Commission on its establishment in December 2001.

Kavanagh was the nephew of James Everett, a former Labour Party cabinet minister. His own son Conal Kavanagh was a member of Wicklow County Council and Wicklow Town Council from 2004 until he retired in 2014.

He died on 13 December 2021, at the age of 86.

References

External links
 

 

1935 births
2021 deaths
Local councillors in County Wicklow
Labour Party (Ireland) TDs
Members of the 19th Dáil
Members of the 20th Dáil
Members of the 21st Dáil
Members of the 22nd Dáil
Members of the 23rd Dáil
Members of the 24th Dáil
Members of the 25th Dáil
Members of the 26th Dáil
Members of the 27th Dáil
Labour Party (Ireland) MEPs
MEPs for the Republic of Ireland 1979–1984
MEPs for the Republic of Ireland 1977–1979
MEPs for the Republic of Ireland 1973–1977
Ministers for the Environment (Ireland)